Smurfs: The Lost Village is a 2017 American computer-animated fantasy adventure comedy film based on The Smurfs comic series by Peyo, produced by Columbia Pictures, Sony Pictures Animation and The Kerner Entertainment Company, and distributed by Sony Pictures Releasing. A reboot of Sony's previous live-action/animated hybrid films and the third installment in Sony's Smurfs film series, the film was directed by Kelly Asbury from a written by Stacey Harman and Pamela Ribon, and stars the voices of Demi Lovato, Rainn Wilson, Joe Manganiello, Mandy Patinkin, Jack McBrayer, Danny Pudi, Michelle Rodriguez, Ellie Kemper, Jake Johnson, Ariel Winter, Meghan Trainor, and Julia Roberts. In the film, a mysterious map prompts Smurfette, Brainy, Clumsy, and Hefty to find a lost village before Gargamel does. The film introduced the female Smurfs, who appeared in the franchise the following year.

Smurfs: The Lost Village premiered on April 2, 2017 and was released in the United States on April 7, 2017 to mixed reviews from critics (although some considered it an improvement over the previous two films), and grossed over $197 million worldwide against a $60 million budget. The film was dedicated to Jonathan Winters, the voice of Papa Smurf in the original film series who died in 2013, Anton Yelchin, the voice of Clumsy Smurf, and Nine Culliford, wife of Peyo, who both died in 2016.

Plot

The Smurfs live peacefully in Smurf Village. Smurfette was created by the evil wizard Gargamel but was redeemed by Papa Smurf and became part of the village. She feels that she does not fit in as she tries to find her purpose in life, which the other Smurfs have. Gargamel makes it his mission to capture the Smurfs, steal all of their essence, and become the most powerful wizard.

During a smurfboarding trip, Smurfette discovers a possible Smurf creature, is captured by Gargamel, and is taken to his castle. There, she accidentally reveals a hat the creature dropped, enabling Gargamel to create a brew that causes him to locate the village on a map. Hefty, Brainy, and Clumsy help Smurfette escape, and they return to Smurf Village. Papa Smurf confines them to their houses as punishment for almost disobeying his orders, dismissing their claims of the existence of another Smurfs village. Smurfette sneaks out to look for the lost village with Brainy, Clumsy, and Hefty. Gargamel discovers them trying to find the village and heads out with his pet cat Azrael and his pet vulture Monty to stop them.

The four follow the map and have various adventures and encounter bizarre creatures, including a colony of fire-breathing dragonflies, which Gargame provokes into attacking the Smurfs. They escape a cavern maze with the help a stampede of glowing green rabbits. Eventually, the four Smurfs reach a river where they sail on a handmade raft. Following a brief chase, Gargamel is thrown out of his own raft, and the Smurfs save him. Instead of thanking them, he pushes them out of their own raft, and they plunge down a waterfall.

The four are captured by leaf-covered creatures who reveal themselves to be female Smurfs. They are taken to Smurfy Grove and meet Smurf Storm, Smurf Blossom, Smurf Lily, Smurf Melody, and their leader Smurf Willow, who all welcome the Smurfs to their home. Smurf Storm and Clumsy head away from the village to locate Gargamel and alert the others. During the trip, Clumsy reveals that Smurfette was created by Gargamel, which causes Smurf Storm to distrust Smurfette. Gargamel, who was led into a piranha-infested swamp, and Azrael spot Clumsy and Smurf Storm. Monty attacks them, but they fly away to return to the village.

Following a village tour, Smurfette grows accustomed to life in Smurfy Grove, to the dismay of Hefty and Brainy. Smurf Storm and Clumsy return, revealing that Smurfette was created by Gargamel. The female Smurfs prepare an attack that night. Papa Smurf, having discovered the quartet's absence, arrives to bring them home, and the female Smurfs accept him into their home. Gargamel, Azrael, and Monty suddenly invade and destroy Smurfy Grove, capturing every Smurf. Smurfette is spared because she is not a real Smurf, and thus, is of no more use to Gargamel, and they leave. Feeling heartbroken, Smurfette is shown a picture of herself with her friends, and after realizing what not being a real Smurf truly means, she heads back to Gargamel's lair to save her fellow Smurfs.

At Gargamel's lair, Papa Smurf and Smurf Willow accept Brainy's escape plan. Hefty, Brainy, Clumsy, and some of the female Smurfs succeed at the plan until Gargamel and Azrael spot them and put Clumsy and some other female Smurfs into his Smurfilator, a machine capable of extracting their essence. Smurfette arrives and deceives Gargamel into believing she wants to be an evil Smurf again. Gargamel tries to turn Smurfette evil again but realizes that she is absorbing his magical powers instead. The lair explodes, sending him, Azrael, and Monty flying back into the piranha lake. The Smurfs are freed, but Smurfette has been reverted to a lifeless lump of clay.

Back at Smurf Village, the Smurfs make a memorial for Smurfette and silently mourn her loss; Papa Smurf refers to her as the truest Smurf of them all. Their energy and love for Smurfette brings her back to life, and everybody celebrates. Smurfette finds her purpose: to be anything she wants to be. Gargamel, Azrael, and Monty walk back to their lair, and Gargamel wrongfully blames Azrael for ruining his plans and reveals Azrael's adoption.

Voice cast
 Demi Lovato as Smurfette, a girl Smurf who was created by the wizard Gargamel and the main protagonist of the film. Surrounded by male Smurfs who each have a clear role in the village, she becomes curious about her own purpose, and betrays Gargamel to join with them.
 Rainn Wilson as Gargamel, an evil wizard and the film's main antagonist who seeks to find the Smurfs and steal their magic in order to become the greatest evil wizard in the world.
 Mandy Patinkin as Papa Smurf, the fatherly Smurf chief leader of Smurf Village and narrator, who does not want his children entering the Forbidden Forest. 
 Joe Manganiello as Hefty Smurf, a strong Smurf who tends to annoy Brainy and has a crush on Smurfette. 
 Jack McBrayer as Clumsy Smurf, an accident-prone and good-natured Smurf who tends to panic.
 Danny Pudi as Brainy Smurf, a book-smart Smurf who butts heads with Hefty and gets annoyed by his antics.
 Julia Roberts as Smurf Willow, the motherly Smurf leader of Smurfy Grove and Papa Smurf's love interest.
 Michelle Rodriguez as Smurf Storm, a tough girl Smurf who sometimes doesn't trust Smurfette because she was created by the wizard Gargamel to undermine the Smurfs. However, Smurfette betrayed Gargamel to join the Smurfs.
 Ellie Kemper as Smurf Blossom, an energetic and naive girl Smurf who quickly befriends Smurfette.
 Ariel Winter as Smurf Lily, a smart and gentle girl Smurf.
 Meghan Trainor as Smurf Melody, a musical girl Smurf.
 Jake Johnson as Grouchy Smurf, a Smurf who is always grouchy and ill-tempered.
 Gordon Ramsay as Baker Smurf, a Smurf who bakes cakes.
 Tituss Burgess as Vanity Smurf, a Smurf who is obsessed with his looks.
 Gabriel Iglesias as Jokey Smurf, a Smurf that plays pranks on others, usually in the form of "gifts".
 Jeff Dunham as Farmer Smurf, a Smurf who is a farmer.
 Kelly Asbury as Nosey Smurf, a Smurf who peeks in on private activities.
 Alan Mechem as Passerby Smurf
 Danik Thomas as Karate Smurf
 Patrick Ballin as Patient Smurf and Frank the Caterpillar.
 Bret Marnell as Snappy Bug, Brainy's ladybug assistant.
 Melissa Sturm as Smurf Jade. Sturm voiced Smurfette in the two spinoffs.
 Frank Welker as Azrael, Gargamel's sardonic pet cat. He comes up with all of Gargamel's plans and is shown to be smarter than his incompetent master even though Gargamel gives him no credit and blames him instead of Monty. Welker reprises his role from the live-action films and the second spinoff.
 Dee Bradley Baker as Monty, Gargamel's dimwitted but ruthless pet vulture. He's just as incompent as his master, who gives him more credit than Azrael.

Production 

On May 10, 2012, two weeks after they announced production of The Smurfs 2, Columbia Pictures and Sony Pictures Animation were already developing a script for The Smurfs 3 with writers Karey Kirkpatrick and Chris Poche. Hank Azaria, who played Gargamel in the first two films, revealed that the third film "might actually deal with the genuine origin of how all these characters ran into each other way back when." Plans for a second sequel were later scrapped, with a completely computer-animated reboot to be produced instead.

Kelly Asbury was confirmed as director in March 2014. It was revealed that the film would explore the origins of the Smurfs, and feature a new take on the characters, with designs and environments more closely following the artwork created by Peyo, the creator of the Smurfs franchise.

Jordan Kerner served as producer, with Mary Ellen Bauder co-producing. On June 14, 2015, Sony Pictures Animation confirmed the original title of Get Smurfy, along with a first look at the film. On February 12, 2016, it was confirmed that the film had been retitled to Smurfs: The Lost Village. LStar Capital and Wanda Pictures co-financed the film.

On January 16, 2015, Mandy Patinkin was added to the cast of the animated adventure film to voice Papa Smurf, who was previously voiced by Jonathan Winters in the live-action/CGI films. On June 14, 2015, Demi Lovato was revealed as the voice of Smurfette, and Rainn Wilson as Gargamel. Since the release of The Smurfs 2 in 2013, two of the Smurfs voice actors from the previous franchise had died, Jonathan Winters who voiced Papa Smurf, and Anton Yelchin, who voiced Clumsy Smurf. The film was dedicated to Winters' and Yelchin's memory. Frank Welker, who voices Gargamel's pet cat Azrael, is the only voice actor to reprise his role from the live-action films.

Music
In October 2016, it was confirmed that Christopher Lennertz would be composing the score for the film. In December 2016, it was reported that singer Meghan Trainor had recorded a song for the film titled "I'm a Lady", which was released as a single. Shaley Scott is featured in two songs, "You Will Always Find Me in Your Heart" and "The Truest Smurf of All".

Release

Theatrical
The film was initially set for release on August 14, 2015, but on May 1, 2014, the release date was pushed back to August 5, 2016. In March 2015, the release date was pushed back again to March 31, 2017. a teaser trailer online for August 14, 2016. In March 2016, the release date was pushed back one final time to April 7, 2017.

Home media
Smurfs: The Lost Village was released on Blu-ray, Ultra HD Blu-ray, and DVD on July 11, 2017 by Sony Pictures Home Entertainment. The film debuted in second place on the Top 20 NPD VideoScan First Alert chart, behind The Fate of the Furious.

Reception

Box office
Smurfs: The Lost Village grossed $45 million in North America and $152.2 million in other territories for a worldwide gross of $197.2 million, against a production budget of $60 million.

In North America, the film opened alongside Going in Style and The Case for Christ and was projected to gross around $16–20 million in its opening weekend from 3,602 theaters. It ended up opening to $13.2 million, marking the lowest debut of the Smurfs franchise by a wide margin and finishing 3rd at the box office.

Critical response
On Rotten Tomatoes, the film has an approval rating of 40% based on 97 reviews and an average rating of 4.8/10. The website's critical consensus reads, "Smurfs: The Lost Village may satisfy very young viewers and hardcore Smurfaholics, but its predictable story and bland animation continue the franchise's recent mediocre streak." On Metacritic, the film has a score 40 out of 100, based on 25 critics, indicating "mixed or average reviews". Audiences polled by CinemaScore gave the film an average grade of "A" on an A+ to F scale, an improvement over the "A−" score earned by both previous Smurfs films. In 2018, the film was awarded The ReFrame Stamp in the 2017 Narrative & Animated Feature Recipients category.

Alonzo Duralde of TheWrap wrote, "It's significant that two female writers have taken a character who's mainly just existed to be cute and seductive and turned her into a full-fledged member of this universe." Owen Glieberman of Variety said, "It's a pure digital fantasy, with elegant and tactile animation, so it's more true to the Smurf spirit, and should perform solidly."

Frank Scheck of The Hollywood Reporter wrote, "Smurfs: The Lost Village is a mediocre effort that nonetheless succeeds in its main goal of keeping its blue characters alive for future merchandising purposes."

Television series

References

External links 

 
 
 
 Production Blog

2017 films
2017 3D films
2017 computer-animated films
2010s American animated films
2010s children's comedy films
2010s fantasy comedy films
American children's animated adventure films
American children's animated comedy films
American children's animated fantasy films
American computer-animated films
American fantasy comedy films
Animated films based on comics
2010s children's fantasy films
Films based on Belgian comics
Reboot films
The Smurfs in film
Columbia Pictures films
Columbia Pictures animated films
Sony Pictures Animation films
Films scored by Christopher Lennertz
Films directed by Kelly Asbury
3D animated films
2017 comedy films
2010s English-language films